Sommeren '92 is a Danish sports comedy directed by Kasper Barfoed. The film is based on the 1992 UEFA European Football Championship, Denmark's greatest ever football triumph.

The team had qualified only after Yugoslavia was disqualified as a result of the breakup and warfare in that country. The film examines the often difficult relationship between the team's coach Richard Møller Nielsen, and the Danish Football Association and leading players that nonetheless led to triumph in 1992.

Cast 
 Ulrich Thomsen as Richard Møller Nielsen
 Mikkel Følsgaard as Kim Vilfort
 Birgitte Hjort Sørensen as Minna Vilfort
 Cyron Melville as Brian Laudrup
 Esben Smed Jensen as John 'Faxe' Jensen
 Henning Jensen as Kaj Johansen
 Gustav Dyekjær Giese as Peter Schmeichel
 Lars Brygmann as Frits Ahlstrøm
 Jon Lange as Kim Christofte
 Allan Hyde as Flemming Povlsen

References

External links 

 

Danish association football films
Denmark at UEFA Euro 1992
2010s sports comedy films
Danish sports comedy films
Films set in 1992
2015 comedy films
2010s Danish-language films
Films scored by Lorne Balfe